L. spectabilis may refer to:

Lacydes spectabilis, a moth species
Lindholmiola spectabilis, a land snail species
Liomys spectabilis, the Jaliscan spiny pocket mouse, a rodent species
Lonchura spectabilis, the hooded mannikin, a bird species
Lupinus spectabilis, a flowering plant species